The following lists events that happened during 1961 in the Union of Soviet Socialist Republics.

Incumbents
First Secretary of the Communist Party of the Soviet Union - Nikita Khrushchev
Chairman of the Presidium of the Supreme Soviet of the Soviet Union - Leonid Brezhnev
Chairman of the Council of Ministers of the Soviet Union - Nikita Khrushchev

Births
 30 March - Sergei Nozikov, former Russian professional footballer

Deaths
 4 October - Metropolitan Benjamin (Fedchenkov), Soviet Orthodox missionary and writer, Exarch of Russian Church in North America (b. 1880)

Events 

 1 September - first of the 1961 Soviet nuclear tests
 13 September - Exhibition of Leningrad artists
 5 November - 1961 Elbarusovo school fire killed 110 students and teachers.

See also
1961 in fine arts of the Soviet Union
List of Soviet films of 1961

References

 
1960s in the Soviet Union
Years in the Soviet Union
Soviet Union
Soviet Union
Soviet Union